Basolus (Basle) (c.555–c.620) was a French Benedictine and hermit. He was born near Limoges, and then became a monk near Verzy. He spent 40 years as a hermit on a hill near Reims.

St-Basle Abbey near Verzy was later named for him. He is a Catholic and Orthodox saint, feast day November 26.

Notes

External links
 Biography
 Basolus van Limoges

French Benedictines
French hermits
7th-century Christian saints
6th-century Christian monks